The 77th Assembly District of Wisconsin is one of 99 districts in the Wisconsin State Assembly.  Located in south-central Wisconsin, the district is contained entirely within the city of Madison in central Dane County, and covers south and central neighborhoods of the city.  It includes most of the University of Wisconsin–Madison campus, as well as Edgewood College, and contains landmarks such as Camp Randall, the University of Wisconsin–Madison Arboretum, and historic Forest Hill Cemetery.  The district is represented by Democrat Shelia Stubbs, since January 2019.

The 77th Assembly District is located within Wisconsin's 26th Senate district, along with the 76th and 78th Assembly districts.

List of past representatives

References 

Wisconsin State Assembly districts
Dane County, Wisconsin